The term twitter bomb or tweet bomb (also spelled as one word) refers to posting numerous (pejoratively, "spamming") Tweets with the same hashtags and other similar content, including @messages, from multiple accounts, with the goal of advertising a certain meme, usually by filling people's Tweet feeds with the same message, and making it a "trending topic" on Twitter. This may be done by individual users, fake accounts, or both.

Advertising 
Twitter bombing may be used for commercial advertising. An early example from  referred to advertising a YouTube video series Ask a Ninja.

Politics 
Twitter bombing is one of the tools used in Internet activism, both by mainstream politicians like Barack Obama and by groups like Anonymous.

The earliest recorded usage of the Twitter bomb is from August 2008, when it was used by bloggers Liza Sabater and Kenneth Quinnell in response to Republican use of the #dontgo hashtag relating to offshore oil drilling. The term was used for other purposes in 2008, but the other meanings have since disappeared.

An example of a Twitter bomb was the campaign organized by online activists in response to a July 31, 2009 Washington Post article on Hillary Clinton that was deemed sexist.

In 2011, it was used extensively by Barack Obama's campaign staff to encourage his followers to contact Congress and encourage them to reach a compromise during the United States debt-ceiling crisis of 2011. Shortly thereafter, @BarackObama lost about 37,000 followers.

Positive impacts 
Twitter bombing/spamming can provide exposure to current events that are not being exposed enough from mainstream media. Dhiraj Murthy writes:

Twitter has received significant media attention in its use to disseminate information during disasters, including the 2008 Mumbai bomb blasts (Dolnick, 2005) and the January 2005 crash of US Airways flight 1549 (Beaumont, 2009).

Linking this with the use of hashtag, see hashtag activism, news and information can be spread around the internet at a rapid pace with the use of hashtags.

Comparison to online spam 
The use of the Twitter bomb tactics has been known to misfire, as people might be offended by spamming, or trolling.

Spammers have several goals, which are phishing, advertising, or malware distribution. Unlike traditional online spamming, such as email, Twitter has a limit of only 280 characters per tweet. Therefore, a Twitter bomb often include URLs in their tweets in order to send others users to their malicious pages online.

Unlike email spam, Twitter bombs may require participation from their targeted users. Fake accounts are a common source of Twitter bombs. In order to avoid Twitter's spam filters and to overcome their lack of followers, Twitter bombs are often sent as a reply to existing tweets about the same topic. This is done in hopes that the authors of the existing tweets will retweet the response to their own followers, spreading the Twitter bomb before the fake account is deleted.

With regards to numbers, an example of a Twitter bomb analyzed in one research paper described how nine fake user accounts produced 929 tweets in 138 minutes, all with a URL to a political website, presenting negative views on the U.S. politician Martha Coakley. The message might have reached about 60,000 before being eliminated by Twitter as spam.

Criticism 
Many Twitter users find comfort in sharing their ideas and thoughts to the general public. Though Twitter can be utilized to spread awareness of a variety of issues and causes, many can take advantage and post numerous tweets that may be viewed as spam. Twitter's rule page considers tweets "spam" once a user displays multiple tweets with unrelated hashtags to a certain topic, or continues to post multiple tweets of the same content in one account. Some instances, these tweets can be viewed as trolling once they begin to seek out other Twitter users for arguments about controversial issues.

See also
Google bomb
Social bot

References

Culture jamming
Internet-based activism
Internet slang
Twitter
2000s neologisms